Matilda I may refer to:

 Matilda I of Boulogne
 Matilda I (tank) - A British tank of the early part of World War II
Empress Matilda - Queen Matilda I of England 

Human name disambiguation pages